The following lists events that happened during 2016 in the State of Palestine.

Incumbents
State of Palestine (UN observer non-member State)
Mahmoud Abbas (PLO), President, 8 May 2005-current
Rami Hamdallah, Prime Minister, 6 June 2013-current
Gaza Strip (Hamas administration unrecognized by the United Nations)
Ismail Haniyeh (Hamas), Prime Minister, 29 March 2006-current

Events
Ayman al-Aloul, Editor-in-Chief of Arab Now Agency in Gaza Strip, and another journalist, Ramzi Herzallah, were detained and allegedly tortured from 3–12 January by Hamas following critical Facebook posts.
Israeli troops raided Birzeit University in Ramallah on 11 January, seizing unidentified materials belonging to Hamas.
The Israeli military bombed a site near the border fence in Beit Lahiya, killing one and injuring three before they could set off an IED. While the Israeli government attributed the operation to its Air Force, Hamas accused the Israeli Navy of firing shells.

See also
2016 in Israel
Timeline of the Israeli–Palestinian conflict in 2016

References

 
State of Palestine
Years of the 21st century in the State of Palestine
2010s in the State of Palestine
State of Palestine